Hubert Benjamin Hughes (15 October 1933 – 7 May 2021) was an Anguillan politician. He was the island territory's Chief Minister from 16 March 1994 to 6 March 2000, and again between February 2010 and April 2015.

He had stated his intention to lead the island to separation from the United Kingdom. This is despite the fact that European Union assistance funds, and visa-free entry to the US, Canada, EU and islands in the French and Dutch Caribbean such as Saint Martin would stop.

References

External links
Anguilla Express: Economy first major task – Chief Minister-elect Hubert Hughes

1933 births
2021 deaths
Chief Ministers of Anguilla
Anguilla Progressive Movement politicians
Anguillan independence activists